Bagdadia salicicolella is a moth in the family Gelechiidae. It was described by Vladimir Ivanovitsch Kuznetsov in 1960. It is found in Turkmenistan.

The larvae feed on Salix species.

References

Moths described in 1960
Bagdadia